The 1992 Asian Taekwondo Championships are the 10th edition of the Asian Taekwondo Championships, and were held at the Stadium Negara, Kuala Lumpur, Malaysia from 31 January to 2 February, 1992.

South Korea finished first in medal table after winning eleven gold medals.

Medal summary

Men

Women

Medal table

References

 Results

External links
WT Official Website

Asian Championships
Asian Taekwondo Championships
Asian Taekwondo Championships
Taekwondo Championships